KGIW (1450 AM) is a radio station licensed to Alamosa, Colorado, United States. The station is owned by William Spears, Jr., through licensee Wolf Creek Broadcasting, LLC.

References

External links

GIW
Classic hits radio stations in the United States